The 2013 Tour of Alberta is the inaugural edition of the Tour of Alberta stage race. The inaugural event is included on the UCI America Tour, with a UCI classification of 2.1. As such, the race was only open to teams on the UCI Pro Tour, UCI Professional Continental and UCI Continental circuits. The race takes place between September 3–8, 2013, as a six-day, six-stage race, traversing the province of Alberta. The race commences in Edmonton and finishes Calgary. The 2013 Tour of Alberta was one of seven UCI-ranked stage races in the North America in 2013.

Due to damages caused by the 2013 Alberta floods, various routes were changed.

Participating teams
In July, the Tour of Alberta announced a sixteen-team field, made up of six UCI ProTeams, two UCI Professional Continental Teams, and seven UCI Continental Teams, thus giving the race a total of fifteen-teams. The remaining two teams are based in Canada.

UCI ProTeams
 
 
 
 
 
 

UCI Professional Continental Teams
 
 

UCI Continental Teams
 
 Canadian National Team
 
 Equipe Garneau-Québecor
 
 
 Team Smartshop-Mountain Khakis

Stages

Prologue

September 3, 2013 — Edmonton to Edmonton,

Stage 1
September 4, 2013 — Strathcona County to Camrose,

Stage 2
September 5, 2013 — Devon to Red Deer,

Stage 3
September 6, 2013 — Strathmore to Drumheller,

Stage 4
September 7, 2013 — Black Diamond to Foothills,

Stage 5
September 8, 2013 — Okotoks to Calgary,

Classification leadership

In the 2013 Tour of Alberta, five jerseys are awarded. For the general classification, calculated by adding the finishing times of the stages per cyclist, the leader receives a yellow jersey. This classification is considered the most important of the USA Pro Cycling Challenge, and the winner of the general classification will be considered the winner of the event.

Additionally, there is also a sprints classification, akin to what is called the points classification in other races, which awards a green jersey. Points are gathered at sprint line performances as well as finishing the stage in the top-fifteen places.

There is also a mountains classification, which awards a polkadot jersey. In the mountains classification, points are won by reaching the top of a mountain before other cyclists. Each climb is categorized, either first, second, third, or fourth category, with more points available for the harder climbs.

There is also a youth classification. This classification is calculated the same way as the general classification, but only young cyclists (under 25) are included. The leader of the young rider classification receives a white jersey.

The red jersey is exclusive to Canadian riders in the race; the jersey is awarded to the Canadian with the best cumulative time.

The last jersey is awarded to the most aggressive rider of a stage for him to wear on the next stage. It is generally awarded to a rider who attacks constantly or spends a lot of time in the breakaways. This jersey is blue.

There is also a classification for teams. In this classification, the times of the best three cyclists per stage are added, and the team with the lowest time is the leader.

Classification standings

General classification

Points classification

King of the Mountains classification

Young Riders classification

Team classification

References

External links

Tour of Alberta
Tour of Alberta
Tour of Alberta
Tour of Alberta